Wensley Bond (1742–1820) was an Irish Anglican priest in the second half of the 18th century and the first two decades of the 19th.

Bond was born in County Longford and educated at Trinity College, Dublin 
 He held livings at Sligo and Clough. He was Dean of Ross from 1743 until 1772. Bond was also Prebendary of Termonbarry in Elphin Cathedral from 1774 to 1775. and Treasurer of Ferns Cathedral from 1776 until his death.

References

Alumni of Trinity College Dublin
Deans of Ross, Ireland
1813 deaths
1742 births
People from County Longford
18th-century Irish Anglican priests
19th-century Irish Anglican priests